Kingdom Come may refer to:

 "Kingdom come", a phrase in the Lord's Prayer in the Bible

Film 
 Kingdom Come (1919 film), a Western short featuring Hoot Gibson
 Kingdom Come (2001 film), a comedy starring LL Cool J
 Kingdom Come, a cancelled film to have been directed by Dean Wright
 Kingdom Come, a 1990 television play by Paul Cornell
 Kingdom Come, a 1993 film starring Sean Patrick Flanery
 Kingdom Come, a 1999 film featuring David Zayas

Literature 
 Kingdom Come (Ballard novel), a 2006 novel by J. G. Ballard
 Kingdom Come (Bragg novel), a 1980 novel by Melvyn Bragg
 Kingdom Come (comics), a 1996 DC Comics miniseries
 Kingdom Come (LaHaye novel), a 2007 Left Behind novel by Tim LaHaye and Jerry B. Jenkins
 Kingdom Come, a 2006 novel by Tim Green
 Kingdom Come, a 2000 novel by Jim Hougan

Music

Artists
 Kingdom Come (band), an American/German hard rock band
 Kingdom Come (British band), a 1970s rock band formed by Arthur Brown, with an eponymous 1972 album

Albums
 Kingdom Come (Bryan & Katie Torwalt album), 2013
 Kingdom Come (Elevation Worship album) or the title song, 2010
 Kingdom Come (Jay-Z album) or the title song, 2006
 Kingdom Come (Kingdom Come album), by the American/German band, 1988
 Kingdom Come (Rebecca St. James album) or the title song (see below), 2022
 Kingdom Come (Sir Lord Baltimore album) or the title song, 1970
 The Kingdom Come, by King T, 2002

Songs
 "Kingdom Come" (Anna Bergendahl song), 2020
 "Kingdom Come" (Rebecca St. James song), 2021
 "Kingdom Come", by the Civil Wars from The Hunger Games: Songs from District 12 and Beyond, 2012
 "Kingdom Come", by Demi Lovato from Confident, 2015
 "Kingdom Come", by Dire Straits from On Every Street, 1991
 "Kingdom Come", by Heavenly from Dust to Dust, 2004
 "Kingdom Come", by Manowar from Kings of Metal, 1988
 "Kingdom Come", by the Mission from Children, 1988
 "Kingdom Come", by Red Velvet from Perfect Velvet, 2017
 "Kingdom Come", by Tom Verlaine from Tom Verlaine, 1979
 "Kingdom Come", by World Party from Bang!, 1993
 "Kingdom Come", a section of Blues, Rags and Stomps, a 1970-1973 composition by Robert Boury

Television episodes  
 "Kingdom Come" (Lego Ninjago: Masters of Spinjitzu)
 "Kingdom Come" (Millennium)
 "Kingdom Come" (The Penguins of Madagascar)

Other uses 
 Kingdom Come, Kentucky
 Kingdom Come State Park
 Kingdom Come: Deliverance, an RPG video game
 Heresy: Kingdom Come, a collectible card game

See also
 Kingcome (disambiguation)
 "Kingdom Coming", an American Civil War song by Henry Clay Work
 Kingdom Coming: The Rise of Christian Nationalism, a 2006 book by Michelle Goldberg
 "Kingdom of Come", a song by Soundgarden from the EP Fopp
 Thy Kingdom Come (disambiguation)
 "Kingdom Comes", a song by Sara Groves from the album Add to the Beauty
 Til Kingdom Come (disambiguation)
 To Kingdom Come (disambiguation)